Jacquian Williams (born July 20, 1988) is a former American football linebacker. He was drafted by the Giants in the sixth round of the 2011 NFL Draft. He played college football at South Florida.

College career

Fort Scott
Williams began his collegiate career at Fort Scott Community College in Fort Scott, Kansas, where he spent his freshman and sophomore seasons. In 2007, as a freshman, he recorded 11 tackles for a loss and 60 tackles in total. The following season, he recorded a total of 72 tackles, 12 for a loss, one interception and a forced fumble. After the season, he was named a National Junior College Athletic Association First–team All-American. He was named an All–Kansas Jayhawk Community College Conference selection in both of his seasons at Fort Scott.

Recruitment
Following his junior college career, Rivals.com considered Williams to be a four-star recruit. During his recruitment process, he received scholarship offers from the University of South Florida, University of Nebraska–Lincoln, University of Alabama at Birmingham, University of Central Florida, and Kansas State University, as well as receiving interest from Oklahoma State University. However, on January 21, 2009, Williams committed to South Florida. Jason Pierre-Paul, Williams's teammate in 2008 in Fort Scott, also signed with South Florida.

South Florida
In his first season for South Florida, Williams spent time at both linebacker and on special teams, appearing in all 13 games. He recorded 28 tackles and one tackle for a loss. He made one start for the Bulls, against the Connecticut Huskies, tallying five tackles and a tackle for a loss. During the 2010 International Bowl against Northern Illinois, Williams made four tackles, helping South Florida win 27–3 in the final edition of the game.

The following year, his senior season, Williams was named a team captain for the Bulls as well as a starter at outside linebacker, starting every game for the team. He led the team with 71 tackles and also recorded 11 tackles for a loss, one interception, and 2.5 sacks. Against Rutgers, he recorded a career-high 11 tackles and also recorded seven tackles against both Miami and Connecticut. Williams finished his career at South Florida with three tackles in the 2010 Meineke Car Care Bowl, which South Florida won 31–26 over the Clemson Tigers. He was named second–team All–Big East after the season.

Williams finished his career at South Florida with 231 tackles, eight sacks, 35 tackles for a loss, three forced fumbles, two fumble recoveries, and three interceptions.

Professional career

Pre-draft

New York Giants
Williams appeared in the ESPN documentary "The Dotted Line", filmed in the months leading up to the 2011 NFL draft. The program depicted the relationship between Williams and his first agent, Eugene Lee of ETL Associates, as well as Williams's decision to dump ETL after the draft.

Williams was selected in the sixth round with the 202nd overall pick by the New York Giants in the 2011 NFL Draft, once again re-uniting him with Jason Pierre-Paul, his teammate at Fort Scott Community College and the University of South Florida. According to Ohm Youngmisuk of ESPN, "Williams caught the Giants' attention with his athleticism, speed and untapped potential." On July 29, Williams signed his rookie contract with the Giants. During training camp, Williams has mainly seen time with third–team defense. In his rookie season, Williams had 78 tackles. He played in all 16 games and made 2 starts.

During the NFC Championship game on January 22, 2012 between the Giants and the San Francisco 49ers, Williams stripped 49ers punt returner Kyle Williams during a punt return and the Giants recovered it in field goal range, which led to the game-winning field goal by Lawrence Tynes and put the Giants in Super Bowl XLVI, their second Super Bowl in four years.

References

External links
New York Giants bio
South Florida Bulls football bio

1989 births
Living people
Players of American football from Tampa, Florida
American football linebackers
South Florida Bulls football players
New York Giants players
Fort Scott Greyhounds football players
Riverview High School (Riverview, Florida)